Alvin Hou, sometimes spelled as Alwin (born 18 September 1996)  is a footballer and futsal player from the Solomon Islands. He plays as a forward for the Kossa in the Telekom S-League and the Solomon Islands national futsal team.

Club career
Hou came through the youth ranks of Real Kakamora and made his debut for the club in 2015. In 2017 he transferred to FC Guadalcanal. A year later he moved to Solomon top club the Solomon Warriors. After one season he moved to Kossa.

International career
Hou made his debut for the Solomon Islands national futsal team on September 18, 2017 in a 4-3 victory against Chinese Taipei. He has played at the 2016 FIFA Futsal World Cup.

International goals
Scores and results list Solomon Islands' goal tally first.

References

1996 births
Living people
Futsal defenders
Solomon Islands footballers
Solomon Islands international footballers
Association football forwards
Solomon Islands men's futsal players
FC Guadalcanal players